
HD 192685, also known as QR Vulpeculae or HR 7739, is a Be star about 1,000 ly away in the Vulpecula constellation. It is visible to the naked eye.

Description

HD 192685 varies slightly in brightness and is classified as a γ Cassiopeiae variable.

From October to December 1982 the Hydrogen alpha absorption line increased in emission strength by 30%.  The line is partially filled by redshifted emission.

HD 192685 has excess infrared emissions (12-100 μm) which are interpreted to be free-free radiation in the gas surrounding the star.

Companions
It has at least one companion with separation 0.55" and magnitude 7.55, and may also be a long-period spectroscopic binary.

References

External links

 

Be stars
Vulpecula
Vulpeculae, QR
B-type main-sequence stars
Gamma Cassiopeiae variable stars
Durchmusterung objects
192685
099824
7739